Monteagle is a town in Franklin, Grundy, and Marion counties in the U.S. state of Tennessee, in the Cumberland Plateau region of the southeastern part of the state. The population was 1,238 at the 2000 census – 804 of the town's 1,238 residents (64.9%) lived in Grundy County, 428 (34.6%) in Marion County, and 6 (0.5%) in Franklin County. The population at the 2020 census was 1,393.

The Marion County portion of Monteagle is part of the Chattanooga–GA Metropolitan Statistical Area, while the Franklin County portion is part of the Tullahoma, TN Micropolitan Statistical Area.

Monteagle is famous for the treacherous stretch of Interstate 24 that passes through the town. It is here that the highway passes over what is colloquially referred to as "The Monteagle" or "Monteagle Mountain", a section of the southern Cumberland Plateau which is a major landmark on the road between Chattanooga and Nashville. The interstate regularly shuts down in inclement weather, routing traffic onto U.S. Route 41. In the Jerry Reed song "The Legend", which is the opening track in the film Smokey and the Bandit, Reed tells the story of the Bandit miraculously surviving brake failure on the "Monteagle Grade". There is also a song called "Monteagle Mountain" by Johnny Cash on the album Boom Chicka Boom.

The town is home to DuBose Conference Center and the Monteagle Sunday School Assembly. The Highlander Folk School, long involved in the labor movement and the civil rights movement, was located here from 1932 to 1961. Rosa Parks attended workshops there shortly before the Montgomery Bus Boycott.

History

Monteagle has long served as a popular point to cross the Cumberland Plateau due to its location along a relatively narrow stretch of the plateau in southern Tennessee. One of the last groups of Cherokees removed from the Southeastern United States along the Trail of Tears passed through what is now Monteagle en route to Oklahoma in late October 1838. This group consisted of approximately 700 Cherokee led by John Bell and escorted by U.S. Army Lieutenant Edward Deas.

In 1872, Moffat donated  of land to Fairmount College, a women's college that had decided to relocate to the area from Jackson, Mississippi. The grounds of the school are now home to the DuBose Conference Center, named for one of the school's early pastors. In 1882, the Chautauqua-inspired Monteagle Sunday School Assembly was established to train Sunday school teachers.

The name of Moffat Station was later changed to "Mount Eagle", and afterwards to "Mounteagle". The spelling had been changed to "Monteagle" by the time the town incorporated in 1962.

Geography
Monteagle is located in the southwest corner of Grundy County and the northwest corner of Marion County at  (35.239941, -85.834372). The Marion-Grundy county line runs east-to-west through the center of town. The town limits extend west into Franklin County as well.

The town straddles a narrow stretch of the Cumberland Plateau known colloquially as "Monteagle Mountain".

Interstate 24 passes through the town just south and west of the town center, with access from Exits 134 and 135. I-24 leads northwest  to Nashville and southeast  to Chattanooga. U.S. Route 41 is Main Street through the town, leading east  to Tracy City and northwest  to Manchester. U.S. Route 41A branches off from US 41 in Monteagle and leads southwest  to Sewanee.

The north side of town drains off the plateau into Layne Cove and is part of the Elk River watershed, while the south side drains into Ladd Cove and Cave Cove, part of the Battle Creek watershed. Both watersheds flow to the Tennessee River.

Climate
Monteagle's climate is subtropical (Cfa) under Köppen, typical of Tennessee. However, it's temperate (Do) under Trewartha due to only having 7 months over 50 °F (10 °C). Additionally, its high precipitation means that it's a rainforest climate more typical of the southern Blue Ridge Mountains (see Appalachian temperate rainforest).

Demographics

2020 census

As of the 2020 United States census, there were 1,393 people, 614 households, and 458 families residing in the town.

2000 census
As of the census of 2000, there were 1,238 people, 477 households, and 321 families residing in the town. The racial makeup of the town was 96.45% White, 1.37% African American, 0.32% Native American, 0.73% Asian, 0.08% from other races, and 1.05% from two or more races. Hispanic or Latino of any race were 0.48% of the population.

There were 477 households, out of which 26.0% had children under the age of 18 living with them, 49.3% were married couples living together, 15.5% had a female householder with no husband present, and 32.7% were non-families. 28.3% of all households were made up of individuals, and 14.9% had someone living alone who was 65 years of age or older. The average household size was 2.33 and the average family size was 2.85.

In the town, the population was spread out, with 19.5% under the age of 18, 7.8% from 18 to 24, 23.0% from 25 to 44, 24.2% from 45 to 64, and 25.5% who were 65 years of age or older. The median age was 45 years. For every 100 females, there were 89.3 males. For every 100 females age 18 and over, there were 80.6 males.

The median income for a household in the town was $24,464, and the median income for a family was $29,886. Males had a median income of $24,643 versus $17,708 for females. The per capita income for the town was $12,983. About 21.7% of families and 25.6% of the population were below the poverty line, including 42.4% of those under age 18 and 17.6% of those age 65 or over.

Places of interest

 DuBose Conference Center
 Monteagle Sunday School Assembly
 Highlander Folk School

Notable people
 Mary Anderson, inventor of the windshield wiper
 Al Capone was a frequent visitor to the RyeMabee mansion in Monteagle prior to his 1931 arrest.
 May Justus, award winning author
 Edwin A. Keeble, architect (Nashville's Life & Casualty Tower)
 William Millsaps, presiding bishop of the Episcopal Missionary Church
 William Alexander Percy, poet and lawyer, bought Brinkwood, a summer house in Monteagle.

References

External links

 
 Town charter

 
Towns in Grundy County, Tennessee
Towns in Marion County, Tennessee
Towns in Franklin County, Tennessee
Towns in Tennessee
Chattanooga metropolitan area 
Tullahoma, Tennessee micropolitan area